Madison Lake is a reservoir in Madison County, Ohio located east of London, at . The community of Madison Lake sits on the western shore of the lake.

History
Work on the lake was started in 1946, when land was deeded to the state for the purpose of building a lake. In 1950, the lake was turned over to the Ohio Department of Natural Resources. The  of land surrounding the lake has since become Madison Lake State Park.

References

Madison County, Ohio
Reservoirs in Ohio